Bhakta Prahlada is a 1942 Indian Kannada-language film directed by K. Subramanyam. The film stars M. V. Rajamma, Chandramma, A. N. Sheshachar and K. V. Achuta Rao. The film also saw Rajkumar's first appearance in a film. He played a school-going child alongside his brother S. P. Varadappa; their father Singanalluru Puttaswamayya played Akhandasura.

Cast
 M. V. Rajamma
 Chandramma
 A. N. Sheshachar
 K. V. Achuta Rao
 Singanalluru Puttaswamayya as Akhandasura
 Rajkumar
 S. P. Varadappa

References

External links
 

1940s Kannada-language films
Films about Prahlada
Indian musical drama films
1940s musical drama films
Indian black-and-white films
1942 drama films
1942 films
Films based on the Bhagavata Purana